Raising Fear is the third studio album by the American heavy metal band Armored Saint. It was released in 1987 via Chrysalis Records. The band recorded the album as a four-piece as guitarist Phil Sandoval had left Armored Saint during the recording of its previous album, Delirious Nomad, although he rejoined the band a few years later.

After Raising Fear was released, Chrysalis dropped the band. This was the last Armored Saint studio album with guitarist Dave Prichard, who was diagnosed with leukemia in 1989 and died of the disease the following year, as the band was preparing for their next album Symbol of Salvation.

Track listing

Personnel
Band Members
John Bush – vocals
Dave Prichard – guitars
Joey Vera – bass
Gonzo Sandoval – drums

Additional musician
Phil Brown – musical contribution

Production
Steve MacMillan, Mike Bosley, David Eaton, Ray Pyle – assistant engineers
Chris Minto – engineering, producer, mixing at Lions Share Studios, Los Angeles, California
Kevin Savigar – special effects
Neil Zlozower – photography
Mike Doud – art direction
Richard Kriegler – cover art
Mastered at Bernie Grundman Mastering Lab, Hollywood, California

References

External links
Official Armored Saint Site
[ Armored Saint on Allmusic Guide]
Armored Saint's Raising Fear on Encyclopaedia Metallum

1987 albums
Chrysalis Records albums
Armored Saint albums
Albums recorded at Sound City Studios